Certified Measurement and Verification Professional (CMVP) is an accreditation from the Association of Energy Engineers (AEE) awarded to qualified professionals in the growing field of Measurement & Verification (M&V) within the energy industry.</ref> Its aim is to acknowledge good practice and raise overall professional standards within the M&V field worldwide.

The right to use the CMVP post-nominal is granted to those who demonstrate proficiency in M&V by passing a 4-hour written exam and meeting the required academic and practical qualifications.

References

Qualifications
Energy conservation